A two-level grammar is a formal grammar that is used to generate another formal grammar, such as one with an infinite rule set. This is how a Van Wijngaarden grammar was used to specify Algol 68. A context-free grammar that defines the rules for a second grammar can yield an effectively infinite set of rules for the derived grammar. This makes such two-level grammars more powerful than a single layer of context-free grammar, because generative two-level grammars have actually been shown to be Turing complete.

Two-level grammar can also refer to a formal grammar for a two-level formal language, which is a formal language specified at two levels, for example, the levels of words and sentences.

Example
A well-known non-context-free language is

A two-level grammar for this language is the metagrammar
N ::= 1 | N1
X ::= a | b
together with grammar schema
Start ::= 
 ::= 
 ::= X

See also
Affix grammar
Attribute grammar
Van Wijngaarden grammar

References

External links
 
  

Formal languages